Nadwasarai (Nadwakhas) is a small village situated 10 km away from Ghosi in Mau district, Uttar Pradesh, India.

It is a typical village with  a population of approximately 5000 to 6000 people as per 2011 population.
The village does not have a reliable 24-hour electricity supply and amenities are basic . In 2005 a telephone exchange was constructed 
It was the first village in India where The Human Resource Development Foundation (HRDF) established a school. The school, Bal Shishu Niketan, was established in 1990 as a Primary school and nursery; it has since been upgraded by the District Education Department of Mau to a class VIII school . There are 350 students, of whom around 30% are female.

References 

Villages in Mau district
Caravanserais in India